.dm is the Internet country code top-level domain (ccTLD) for the Commonwealth of Dominica in the eastern Caribbean.  Registrants of a second-level .dm domain get the corresponding third-level names within .com.dm, .net.dm and .org.dm automatically included.  There are no restrictions on who can register these names, but they are not very heavily used.

One example of a ".dm" web property is a URL shortener, play.dm, used exclusively by Playdom, which is an example of domain hacking.

See also 
Internet in Dominica

References

External links 
 IANA .dm whois information
 .dm registration website

Country code top-level domains
Communications in Dominica
Computer-related introductions in 1991

sv:Toppdomän#D